The Churún River is a river in Venezuela, part of the Orinoco River basin. It rises in Canaima National Park, and its mouth is the Carrao River.

Gallery

References

Rivers of Venezuela
Orinoco basin